Frode og alle de andre rødder (literally Frode and all the other rascals) is a famous Danish children's book, that was also adapted to a feature film. It is about the adventures of Frode who learns about a summer festival and wants to go there except that it can cost 5000 kroners and he has to arrange for its financing.

Book
Frode og alle de andre rødder is a book written by Ole Lund Kirkegaard, a Danish writer of children's literature and youth literature. It was published in 1979.

Film
The book was adapted into a film in 2008 and is directed by Bubber and produced by Tivi Magnusson, Tomas Radoor, Johanne Stryhn Felding and Christian Potalivo. 
Cast
Arto Louis Eriksen as Frode
Sasha Sofie Lund as Stinne
Thomas Meilstrup as Læris
Ole Thestrup as Storm
Birthe Neumann as Irene TV
Bodil Jørgensen as Fru Rask
Nicolaj Kopernikus as Lærer Peter
Rasmus Bjerg as Vicevært
Nominations
In the 2009 Robert Festival, it was nominated for a Robert for:
"Best Children/Family Film" for director Bubble
"Best Song" for Thomas Buttenschøn

References

External links
Film official website

1979 Danish novels
2008 films
Danish children's films
Danish-language films
Films based on children's books